The 1992–93 George Washington Colonials men's basketball team represent George Washington University as a member of the Atlantic 10 Conference during the 1992–93 NCAA Division I men's basketball season. The team was coached by Mike Jarvis and played their home games at the Charles E. Smith Athletic Center. The Colonials finished in a four-way tie for second place in the regular season conference standings. After being knocked out in the opening round of the A-10 tournament, GW received an at-large bid to the 1993 NCAA tournament as No. 12 seed in the West region. The Colonials made a run to the Sweet Sixteen by defeating No. 5 seed New Mexico and No. 13 seed Southern. The team was eliminated from the tournament by the famed Fab Five from Michigan, 72–64, to finish with a record of 21–9 (8–6 A-10).

Roster

Schedule and results

|-
!colspan=9 style=| Regular season

|-
!colspan=9 style=| Atlantic 10 Tournament

|-
!colspan=9 style=| NCAA Tournament

Rankings

References

George Washington
George Washington Colonials men's basketball seasons
George Washington